Thomas Grant (born 31 May 1995) is a Scottish footballer who plays as a midfielder, most recently for Alloa Athletic.

He is the son of former Aberdeen player Brian Grant.

Career
Born in Aberdeen, Grant began his career at Falkirk. He made his debut on 10 November 2012, replacing Jonathan Flynn for the final four minutes of a 2–1 Scottish Football League Division One loss at Raith Rovers. He made 23 appearances in his first season, scoring the opening goal of a 2–0 win at Dumbarton on 23 February 2013. On 3 August 2013, he scored the final goal of Falkirk's 3–0 win over Clyde in the first round of the Scottish League Cup. For much of the 2013–14 season he suffered from the effects of a virus and was unable to play football, making only 8 appearances compared to 27 in the previous campaign.

In January 2015, Grant was loaned to Scottish League Two team Arbroath for the remainder of the season. He scored twice in eleven matches there: in a 3–1 loss at Berwick Rangers on 14 February, and a free kick in a 5–0 home win over the same team on 2 May which qualified the team for the promotion play-offs. After only 7 first-team appearances, Grant was released by Falkirk in January 2016.

On 5 March 2016, Grant signed for Fleetwood Town until the end of the 2015–16 season. Ten days later, he made his debut in Football League One, playing the entirety of a 0–1 loss to Walsall at Highbury Stadium. He was released by Fleetwood during the January 2017 transfer window. Grant signed a short-term contract with Scottish League One club Stenhousemuir in February 2017. He left Stenhousemuir at the end of the 2016–17 season, then signed for Alloa Athletic.

Career statistics

References

External links

1995 births
Living people
Footballers from Aberdeen
Association football midfielders
Scottish footballers
Falkirk F.C. players
Arbroath F.C. players
Scottish Football League players
Scottish Professional Football League players
Fleetwood Town F.C. players
English Football League players
Stenhousemuir F.C. players
Alloa Athletic F.C. players